JCW may refer to:
 J. C. Williamson's, Australian entertainment organization
 Jewish Community Watch, an Orthodox Jewish anti-abuse organization 
 John Cooper Works, a British car company
 Joint Committee on Women in the Mathematical Sciences, part of the history of women in mathematics in the United States
 Juggalo Championship Wrestling, a hardcore wrestling league